This is a list of seasons completed by the Wichita State Shockers men's college basketball team.

Seasons

Notes

Wichita State Shockers
Wichita State Shockers men's basketball seasons
Wichita State Shockers basketball seasons